Euphorbia iharanae is a species of plant in the family Euphorbiaceae. It is endemic to Madagascar.  Its natural habitat is rocky shores. It is threatened by habitat loss.

References

Endemic flora of Madagascar
iharanae
Critically endangered plants
Taxonomy articles created by Polbot